Marcin Kubsik (born 30 September 1975) is a former Polish footballer who played as a midfielder. Kubsik made a total of 23 top flight appearances in Poland, and spent time abroad playing in Greece, Cyprus, and Germany.

Biography

Lechia Gdańsk
Born in Gdańsk Kubsik started playing with the youth sides of his local team, Lechia Gdańsk. He joined the first team for the 1993–94 season, making his professional debut in the 1–0 defeat against Olimpia Poznań on 31 July 1993. During his first two seasons with Lechia, they struggled in the II liga, nearly being relegated in the first season, and being relegated in his second season with the club. For the 1995–96 season Lechia were involved in a merger with Olimpia Poznań, creating the Olimpia-Lechia Gdańsk team. Olimpia-Lechia Gdańsk took Olimpia Poznań's place in the I liga, while the Lechia Gdańsk team from the previous season was renamed as Lechia Gdańsk II and operated as the clubs official second team, playing in the III liga after the previous seasons relegation. Kubsik spent the first half of the season playing with the Lechia Gdańsk II team. After the winter break Kubsik was promoted to the Olimpia-Lechia team and made his I liga debut on 24 March 1996 in a 2–1 defeat to Stomil Olsztyn. Kubsik would go on to make a total of 8 appearances for Olimpia-Lechia in the top division. At the end of the season Olimpia-Lechia were relegated, and the Olimpia-Lechia team were dissolved. The Lechia Gdańsk team that ran as the clubs second team took the place of the Olimpia-Lechia team in the league, and operated as an independent first team again. Over the course of the next two seasons Kubsik would play a further 61 times in the league, scoring 9 goals in the process. At the beginning of the 1998–99 season Lechia were once again involved in a merger, this time with Polonia Gdańsk, creating the Lechia-Polonia Gdańsk team. Kubsik's debut under the Lechia-Polonia name came on 25 July 1998 in a 2–1 win over Polonia-Szombierki Bytom, another club being operated after a merger between two clubs. He would spend 2.5 years with Lechia-Polonia before leaving in 2001. During his time with Lechia Gdańsk and the two resulting merger teams, Kubsik made a total of 206 appearances and scored 14 goals, and is one of only two players to have played for each of Lechia, Olimpia-Lechia and Lechia-Polonia.

After Lechia

After leaving Lechia-Polonia over the winter break in 2001, he joined I liga team Zagłębie Lubin. His debut for Zagłębie came on 7 March 2001 in the Polish Cup, coming on as a substitute in a 4–0 win over Legia Warsaw. His league debut came 4 days later, also against Legia, this time playing in a 3–1 win. He made 5 I liga appearances for Zagłębie in his first season with the club. In his second season with Zagłębie he found himself playing in the league often, making a total of 10 league appearances, and scoring his first, and what would be his only goal, in Poland's top division against GKS Katowice. Kubsik left Zagłębie during the break, 12 months after joining the club, and moved to play with Jagiellonia Białystok. After joining Jagiellonia Kubsik spent the next two seasons playing for four clubs. not spending more than six months with each club he played for. With Jagiellonia he made 10 appearances, scored 1 goal, and was sent off twice as Jagiellonia suffered relegation to the third tier. Over the summer he would join ŁKS Łódź failing to make an appearance with the club and joining fellow II liga club Stomil Olsztyn, making 12 appearances for the club, as he once again suffered relegation. After relegation with Jaga he started playing with Błękitni Stargard, making 14 appearances, and leaving the club in January during the winter break. At the end of the season Błękitni also suffered relegation to the III liga.

Greece, Cyprus, Germany, and return to Poland
After what would have been three relegations with three clubs in three years, Kubsik moved to Greece, playing his football with Thrasyvoulos spending 18 months playing with the club. He spent seasons with Apollon Smyrnis and Agios Dimitrios, before spending 6 months with Cypriot team Digenis Akritas. In January 2008 Kubsik moved to Germany to play with Viktoria Köln. At the end of the season Kubsik left Viktoria, stating reasons due to the club failing to get promoted and the club failing to pay the wages of three Polish players on high wages, Kubsik included. Upon his return to Poland he joined Bałtyk Gdynia for 6 months, making 13 appearances in the III liga, spending the rest of the season with Kaszubia Kościerzyna. Kubsik spent a total of 2 years with Kaszubia, making 47 league appearances in the process. After his time with Kaszubia he played for lower league clubs Grom Kleszczewo and Powiśle Dzierzgoń, retiring from playing in 2012.

After playing
After his retirement from playing football Kubsik has gone into coaching, coaching various levels of the Lechia Gdańsk academy set up.

References

1975 births
Living people
Polish footballers
Association football midfielders
Lechia Gdańsk players
Zagłębie Lubin players
Jagiellonia Białystok players
ŁKS Łódź players
OKS Stomil Olsztyn players
Błękitni Stargard players
Apollon Smyrnis F.C. players
Digenis Akritas Morphou FC players
FC Viktoria Köln players
Bałtyk Gdynia players
Polish expatriate footballers
Expatriate footballers in Greece
Expatriate footballers in Cyprus
Expatriate footballers in Germany
Polish expatriate sportspeople in Greece
Polish expatriate sportspeople in Cyprus
Polish expatriate sportspeople in Germany